Samuel Orcutt (1824–1893) was an American historian and genealogist. He is the author of many books on Connecticut towns and family histories.  Orcutt also wrote a history called The Indians of the Housatonic and Naugatuck Valleys (Hartford, Conn. : Press of the Case, Lockwood & Brainard Co., 1882).

Books
 Henry Tomlinson, and his descendants in America : with a few additional branches of Tomlinsons, later from England / by Samuel Orcutt. ([Salem, Mass. : Higginson Book Co., 2007?]) 
 A history of the city of Bridgeport, Connecticut / by Rev. Samuel Orcutt. ([New Haven, Ct.] : Published under the auspices of the Fairfield County Historical Society, 1887) 
 The history of the old town of Derby, Connecticut, 1642-1880 : with biographies and genealogies / by Samuel Orcutt and Ambrose Beardsley. (Springfield, Mass. : Springfield Print. Co., 1880)
 A history of the old town of Stratford and the city of Bridgeport, Connecticut. ([New Haven, Conn. : Press of Tuttle, Morehouse & Taylor], 1886) 
 History of the town of Wolcott (Connecticut) from 1731 to 1874, with an account of the centenary meeting, September 10 and 11, 1873; and with the genealogies of the families of the town.' (Waterbury, Conn., Press of the American printing company, 1874) 
 History of the towns of New Milford and Bridgewater, Connecticut, 1703-1882, (Hartford, Conn., Press of the Case, Lockwood and Brainard company, 1882)
 History of Torrington, Connecticut, from its first settlement in 1737, with biographies and genealogies.'' (Albany, J. Munsell, printer, 1878)

References

1824 births
1893 deaths
Historians of the United States
Historians of Connecticut
American genealogists